

House of Champagne, 1234–1285

House of Capet, 1284-1349

Notes

 
Champagne